Macrocoma parvula is a species of leaf beetle of the Democratic Republic of the Congo and Senegal, described by Martin Jacoby in 1895.
He found it near Bismarckburg, Togo.

References 

parvula
Beetles of the Democratic Republic of the Congo
Taxa named by Martin Jacoby